Attilio Trerè (9 October 1887 – 2 January 1943) was an Italian professional footballer, who played as a midfielder, and in his early years as a goalkeeper. His brother, Alessandro, also played for Milan as a footballer. Attilio is a member of the A.C. Milan Hall of Fame. He represented the Italy national football team five times, the first being Italy's first ever match on 15 May 1910, the occasion of a friendly match against France in a 6–2 home win. He was also part of Italy's squad for the football tournament at the 1912 Summer Olympics, but he did not play in any matches.

Notes

References

External links
Profile at Magliarossonera.it 
International caps at FIGC.it 

1887 births
1943 deaths
A.C. Milan players
Association football goalkeepers
Association football midfielders
Italian footballers
Italy international footballers